Vembadithalam  is a small village in Salem district of Tamil Nadu, India. The village comes under the Veerapandi Union. Vembadithalam means Land of Neem. Vembu is nothing but neem tree. Other nicknames of this village are Vembai and Vems City.
Salem is nearest city (15 km) for Vembai and well connected with NH47. Every half an hour public buses and private buses help to commute the people between Vembai and Salem.
Vembadithalam is located 6.8 km from its Taluk Main Town Veerapandi. It is located 19.9 km from its District Main City Salem.

Nearby villages are Kanagagiri (1.9 km), Naduvaneri (2.4 km), Senaipalayam (2.6 km), Rakkipatti (3.5 km), Periya Seeragapadi (4 km). Nearest Towns are Veerapandi (6.8 km), Konganapuram (12.7 km), Salem (14.7 km), Taramangalam (15.3 km).

Anaikuttapatti, Ariyagoundampatti, Chennagiri, Inambiroji, Kadathur Agr and Keerapappambadi,  are the villages along with this village in the same Veerapandi Taluk.

Vembadithalam Pin Code is 637504 and has a post office. Other near by villages coming under this Post Office (637504) are Naduvaneri, Vembadithalam, Kandarkulamanickam, Rakkipatti, Kalparapatti

Overview 

This village has one government primary school, a government higher secondary school and a government hospital with decent space and buildings. The schools and Hospital are very good in facilities when compared to surrounding villages. It has very small public library and had very good movie hall but it was closed few years ago because of some financial reason.

Now the Vembadithalam Primary School (Elementary School, from 1st Standard Class to 5th Class) infrastructure  is in pathetic picture of neglect and utter lack of basic facilities by officials and the big people of Vembadithalam. Please visit the school to understand the situation. This shows the domination of matriculation and private schools. The little students here are from underprivileged category. A personal visit to the school shown that these students are very brilliant and willing to learn and excel in their studies. The Primary School seriously needs help from all the ends like old students of the school, businessmen, officials etc.

While Higher Secondary School getting financial help from all the ends like few engineering colleges, polytechnic and businessmen for their personal benefit but Vembadithalam Primary School(Elementary School) does not get any help.

Culture 

Textile is most important business. Mostly Devanga Chettiar community people reside here doing the textile business or they inspired other community people to follow the textile business. On every week of Tuesday weaver gets weekly wages and they will do their purchases in nearby weekly market. Sri Ramalinga Sowdeswari Amman, Marriamman and Kaliamman temple, Subramanya swamy temple and Perumal Kovil (temple) and Kasi Vishwanatha temple are major temples.Sri Ramalinga Sowdeswari Amman, Marriamman (most famous) and Kaliamman festivals are celebrated every year without fail. Whole village get the new color on those festival days. Sowdeswari Amman festival is celebrated in the month of January (Tamil month of Thai). The people belong to Kannada Devanga Chettiar family celebrate this Sowdeswari Amman festival and it is a three to four-day festival featuring Knife dance (Kathi Dance and Veramutti), Sakthi, Jyothi, etc. During this festival famous Veramutti vesam and it devotional steps are fantastic experience to see. 

Mr. Shanmugaraj from Vembadithalam about 36 years doing this veramutti vesam as devotional service to God. Steps followed in this Veramutti having big devanga history. Entertainment includes an orchestra (both classical and western) and drama, etc. Marriamman and Kaliamman festivals are celebrated annually in the Tamil month of 'Panguni'. It is also a two to three-day festival, there will be activities like Thee Gundam (walking on fire), pongal (making sweet food for Amman) and vandi vedikkai (show of decorated vehicles or bullock carts with some themes) in the evening of last day.

At Vembadithalam, the first initiative of Siddharism and Pathinen Siddhar's Indhu Vedam practices for Merkku Mandalam was started in 1981 by Mr R J Venkatramanan and family and the "Mukambigai Alayam" was started by his father Mr A.K.R Jegannathan in their land closer to the lake. Subsequently from this initiatives and blessing of Pathinen Siddhar madam and His Holiness Gurdevar and with involvement of many siddharadiyans of Vembadithalam, it had a unique recognition of having the Padhinon Siddhar "Tharu Kulam" which was built through the co-ordinated efforts of Vembadithalam Siddhar Addiyaans, Mr R J Venkatramanan, Mr T.R.Ramalingam, Mr Venkatesan, Mr Srinivasan, Mr Vijayragavan, Mr Mani, Mr L.K. Ganesan and other supporters, it was blessed and spiritualized by His Holiness Gnaalaguru Siddhar Arasayogi Karuwooraar, 12th Pathinen Siddhar Peedaathipathi. During the year 1985 His Holiness Gurudevar visited vembadithalam for the second time and had a Public meeting. Subsequently, with the blessings of His Holiness Gurudevar and the hard efforts of Venkatesan, Mani and others Pathinen Siddhar Peedam-
Tharukulam was started in the own place. From the very inception of Tharukulam Oma, Oga, yaga, Yagna, Velvi poosais were performed there by the Siddharadiyans.

The famous playback singer Krishnaraj (Vellarika.. Vellarika from Kadhal Kottai and Thanjavooru man eduthu from Porkaalam films fame) was born and brought up in Vembadithalam. His Friend Mr. Thangaraj (Ramayanakarar) is a famous singer from this village. During 19th century he was the person to Thought about Ramayananam to the people of Vembadithalam. So they always called with special name of "Ramayanakarar "

The festival of pongal is celebrated very grandly for 3 days in this town.

Current business 

The early business in Vembadithalam started with handlooms and weavers getting yarns from Salem and weaving them. Then slowly started their own business and as per current trend cotton clothes manufacturing, especially silk sarees are being manufactured and distributed throughout India.

Facilities 
Tamil Nadu’s first rural telephone exchange opened in Vembadithalam. Mr. Chandra Sekaran has worked as a first in charge of that. It happened because of two weavers from this village; they were persons who weaved the polyester with handloom and show the new market for polyester yarn. Their name is Mr. KMS Rangasamy Chettiar and Mr. KMS Mari Chettiar, respectively. Then Tamil Nadu governor VV Giri came to village to honour them. These two legend helped the village to have decent Govt hospital, Govt Primary school and a very good and well maintained Govt Higher Secondary School. Students from surrounding villages like Rakkipatti, Seeragapady, Elampillai, Vaikuntham, Sankakiri, Attayampatti, Vennandhur all travel to this Government Higher Secondary School to pursue their study. This Government Higher Secondary School is well equipped with all Physics Lab, Chemistry Lab, Computer Labs and a wide eco-friendly playground. The one good thing about this school is whenever teacher transfer counselling happen, teachers are literally willing to come to this school to serve their entire service and Scholl celebrated its golden jubilee years Today 25.01.2014.

It is known fact that Mr. Dhanasekaran belonging to this village had first started the yarn business years ago. Then the yarn business spread over to nearby villages Elambillai, Perumagoundan Patti and Attayampatti.

Education 

Vembadithalam is close to Maisurii Polytechnic College and the Knowledge Institute of Technology. There are also several secondary schools nearby.

Political facts 

This village comes under Veerapandi political constituency and the famous  Late.Veerapandi S Arumugam (affectionately called as Veerapaandiar) was from this constituency only. His son Veerapandi A. Raja was the former MLA for this constituency.
Mr. S.V Varadharajan Ex. MLA (Salem-1)& All world MGR mantra state leader, who is from this village and his son also is a famous doctor.(Dr. V.Gopalakrishnan) and his younger son V. Dhanapal, former vice president of Vembadithalam is a well known in this area.
Mrs. Vijayalakshmi Palanisamy served as a minister when elected from this constituency.

References 

Villages in Salem district